Lyons Township is a township in Minnehaha County, in the U.S. state of South Dakota.

History
Lyons Township most likely has the name of a pioneer settler.

References

{

Townships in Minnehaha County, South Dakota
Townships in South Dakota